Aaynata may refer to:

Aynata in Bint Jbeil District, in southern Lebanon
Ainata in Baalbek District, in northern Lebanon
Ain Aata, in Rashaya District of the Beqaa Governorate in Lebanon